Ann Turner may refer to:

People
 Ann Turner (writer) (born 1945), American children's author and poet
 Ann Turner (director) (born 1960), Australian film director and screenwriter
 Ann Turner (canoeist) (born 1956), American canoeist
 Ann Turner, "a half-blooded Miami" Indian noted in the 1818 Treaty of St. Mary's
 Ann Tennant ("Ann Turner" erron.), British 1875 murdered "witch" noted in the 1945 murder of Charles Walton

Fiction
 Ann Turner, played by Dorothy Fay in the 1938 film The Stranger From Arizona

See also
 Ann Turner Robinson (died 1741), English 18th-century soprano
 Ann Turner Cook (1926–2022), American educator, mystery writer, Gerber baby logo model
 Anne Turner (disambiguation)
 Anna Turner (disambiguation)